Charlie Wi (born 3 January 1972) is a South Korean professional golfer who plays on the PGA Tour Champions. He previously played on the PGA, European, and Asian Tours. He was a one-time winner on the European Tour, and a seven-time winner on the Asian Tour.

Early life and amateur career
Wi was born in Seoul, and moved to Los Angeles, United States at the age of 10. He attended the University of California, Berkeley, after briefly attending the University of Nevada, Reno and had a successful amateur career.

Professional career
Wi turned professional in 1995. Early in his career, Wi played all over the world, competing on the European, Asian and Japanese tours. He had most success on the Asian Tour where he finished second on the money list in 2001, just behind Thongchai Jaidee, having won three times during the season.

Wi earned his place on the PGA Tour for 2005 when he successfully negotiated all three stages of the 2004 qualifying school. However, he did not do well enough in his rookie season to retain his card, and went back to play on the Asian Tour in 2006, finishing 4th on the money list. He also competed on the second tier Nationwide Tour, before returning to qualifying school where he regained his place on the PGA Tour for 2007.

In February 2006, Wi secured the biggest win of his career, when he won the Maybank Malaysian Open, an event co-sanctioned by the European and Asian tours.

In May 2011, Wi finished runner-up at a PGA Tour event for the fourth time in his career losing to David Toms at the Crowne Plaza Invitational at Colonial. Wi was seven strokes behind Toms at the halfway stage, but shot a 66 during the third round to take a one stroke lead into the final round. Wi held his lead until midway through the final round when Toms holed out from the fairway for an eagle and would eventually go on to lose by one stroke.

Wi finished as runner-up in February 2012 at the AT&T Pebble Beach National Pro-Am after taking a three stroke 54 hole lead into the final round. He shot a final round 72 to finish at 15 under, but lost out by two strokes as Phil Mickelson came from six back to claim the title with an 8 under par round of 64. This marked the fifth occasion on which Wi had recorded a second-place finish on the PGA Tour in his career.

Swing style
Wi's golf swing style fits the model known as stack and tilt, and he helped to choose this name. He is coached since 2005 by Mike Bennett and Andy Plummer, who consider him the best example of their swing model:

Wi does not transfer body weight to the trail leg on back swing but moves the weight forward during the whole swing, even with the driver. He performs a steep shoulder turn around a steady axis.

Amateur wins
1990 California State Amateur
1995 Southern California Amateur

Professional wins (9)

European Tour wins (1)

*Note: The 2006 Maybank Malaysian Open was shortened to 54 holes due to weather.
1Co-sanctioned by the Asian Tour

Asian Tour wins (7)

*Note: The 2006 Maybank Malaysian Open was shortened to 54 holes due to weather.
1Co-sanctioned by the Korean Tour
2Co-sanctioned by the European Tour

Asian Tour playoff record (1–0)

Korean Tour wins (5)
2001 SK Telecom Open (co-sanctioned with the Asian Tour), Shinhan Donghae Open (co-sanctioned with the Asian Tour)
2002 SK Telecom Open (co-sanctioned with the Asian Tour)
2004 Pocari Sweat Open
2005 GS Caltex Masters

Results in major championships

CUT = missed the half way cut
"T" indicates a tie for a place.
Note: Wi never played in the Masters Tournament.

Results in The Players Championship

CUT = missed the halfway cut
"T" indicates a tie for a place

Results in World Golf Championships

"T" = Tied

Team appearances
Professional
Dynasty Cup (representing Asia): 2003 (winners)
World Cup (representing South Korea): 2006, 2009
Royal Trophy (representing Asia): 2009 (winners), 2010

See also
2004 PGA Tour Qualifying School graduates
2006 PGA Tour Qualifying School graduates
List of golfers with most Asian Tour wins

References

External links

South Korean male golfers
Asian Tour golfers
Japan Golf Tour golfers
European Tour golfers
PGA Tour golfers
Golfers from Seoul
Sportspeople from Los Angeles County, California
People from North Hills, Los Angeles
Sportspeople from Ventura County, California
1972 births
Living people